Dicken Ashworth (born 18 July 1946) is an English actor.

Career
Ashworth's film credits include King of the Wind, Force 10 from Navarone, Tess, Krull and Wallace & Gromit: The Curse of the Were-Rabbit.

On television, Ashworth played Alan Partridge in Brookside from 1983 to 1985, Jeff Horton in Coronation Street from 1992 to 2000 and Duke Woods in Emmerdale from 2007 to 2008. Other television credits include Grange Hill, Juliet Bravo, Minder, Blake's 7, The Chinese Detective, Doctor Who, C.A.T.S. Eyes, The Bill, Boon, Inspector Morse, Dangerfield, Keeping Up Appearances, Heartbeat and Where the Heart Is.

Ashworth appears in the video to the Pretenders' 1986 single "Don't Get Me Wrong".

Filmography

External links
 

1946 births
Living people
English male film actors
English male television actors
People from Todmorden
Male actors from Yorkshire